Longleng Assembly constituency is one of the 60 Legislative Assembly constituencies of Nagaland state in India.

It is part of Longleng District and is reserved for candidates belonging to the Scheduled Tribes.

Members of the Legislative Assembly

Election results

2018

See also
 List of constituencies of the Nagaland Legislative Assembly
 Longleng district

References

Longleng district
Assembly constituencies of Nagaland